Aba is a town in Fejér County, Hungary.

In 1559, it was the property of Mihály Cseszneky and Balázs Baranyai.

Notable residents
 Imre Taussig (1894–1945), footballer

Demographics

Sources
 Szíj Rezső: Várpalota
 Fejér megyei történeti évkönyv
 Hofkammerarchiv Wien
 Dudar története

References

External links

  in Hungarian
 The jewish community in Aba On JewishGen website. 

Populated places in Fejér County
Jewish communities destroyed in the Holocaust